Dream Team 1935 is a 2012 Latvian biographical sports drama film directed by Aigars Grauba about the Latvia national basketball team which won EuroBasket 1935, the first FIBA European basketball championship.

Plot
The first European Championship in basketball is about to take place in Geneva. The event is organized by FIBA, the newly established international basketball organization and European national teams are going to play each other for the first time. Each wants the honor of being the first European champion.

Meanwhile, in Latvia, coach Valdemārs Baumanis is convinced that he can gather the team and get them take it to Geneva. However, on his journey he quickly learns that triumph and defeat are all part of the game. Baumanis encounters many difficulties, as well as unexpected help from those closest to him. Against all odds, Baumanis's determination to persist and win is rewarded when the unknown team from Latvia ends up defeating the favored competitors.

Cast
 Jānis Āmanis as Valdemārs Baumanis
 Inga Alsiņa as Elvīra Baumane
 Vilis Daudziņš as Coach Dekšenieks
 Pēteris Gaudiņš as the Sport Committee chairman
 Intars Rešetins as the bureaucrat
 Mārcis Maņjakovs as Rūdolfs Jurciņš
 Gints Andžāns as Andrejs Krisons
 Andris Bulis as Džems Raudziņš
 Viktors Ellers as Aleksejs Anufrijevs
 Artūrs Krūzkops as Herberts Gubiņš
 Mārtiņš Liepa as Mārtiņš Grundmanis
 Mārtiņš Počs as Visvaldis Melderis
 Jānis Vimba as Jānis Lidmanis
 Artūrs Putniņš as Eduards Andersons
 Miķelis Žideļūns as Edgars Rūja

Production Location
Dream Team 1935 was shot in Latvia and Geneva. The film's production took about two and a half years and included 80 shooting days. The studio backlot Cinevilla was used for many of the shoots. Cinevilla covers about 80 ha and is the largest studio backlot on Northern Europe. Sound editing for the film was done in the Czech Republic.

Other
Dream Team 1935 was first shown to the public in Latvia on November 19, 2012. In early 2013 Dream Team 1935 premiered as the international English language version of the film.

References

External links
 
 Official website

2012 films
Latvian comedy films
Basketball films
Films directed by Aigars Grauba
Latvian drama films